The Dhansa Bus Stand metro station is a part of the Grey Line of the Delhi Metro. The station was opened on 18 September 2021.

Station layout

Entry/Exit

Facilities 
The station is the first in the Delhi Metro system to have an underground car park. It is connected with an existing bus station.

See also 
List of Delhi Metro stations
Transport in Delhi
Delhi Metro Rail Corporation
Delhi Suburban Railway

References

External links

Delhi Metro stations